Pseudomorphinae is a subfamily of ground beetles in the family Carabidae. There are about 12 genera and at least 360 described species in Pseudomorphinae.

Genera
These 12 genera belong to the subfamily Pseudomorphinae:

 Adelotopus Hope, 1836
 Cainogenion Notman, 1925
 Cryptocephalomorpha Ritsema, 1875
 Guyanemorpha Erwin, 2013
 Manumorpha Erwin & Geraci, 2008
 Notopseudomorpha Baehr, 1997
 Paussotropus C.O.Waterhouse, 1877
 Pseudomorpha Kirby, 1823
 Samiriamorpha Erwin & Geraci, 2008
 Sphallomorpha Westwood, 1840
 Tuxtlamorpha Erwin & Geraci, 2008
 Yasunimorpha Erwin & Geraci, 2008

References

 
Carabidae subfamilies